Hala Sedki George Younan (born June 15, 1961 in Cairo) is an Egyptian actress. She began her career with the director  Nour Al Demirdash in Rehlet Al Melion and has worked in more than 30 films. She has also received the Best Actress Award from Cairo International Film Festival. Hala has also worked in many successful TV series such as Abyas w Eswed, Awrak Misrya, Arabisk, Zaman Al Aolama and Ynabei El Eshk. She also as finished shooting a big film called "Young Alexander", which is about the story of Alexander the Great.

Filmography 
Reaction
Young Alexander the Great (2007) .... Olympias, Queen of Macedonia
Heya Fawda (2007)
... a.k.a. Chaos (Canada: English title) 
... a.k.a. Chaos, Le (France) 
... a.k.a. Chaos, This Is (USA) 
Mateegy norkos (2006)
Alexandrie... New York (2004) .... Bonnie
... a.k.a. Alexandria... New York (USA)

... a.k.a. Ghadab, El (Egypt: Arabic title)
 
... a.k.a. Iskanderija... New York (Egypt: Arabic title)

... a.k.a. Iskinderia... New York (El ghadab) (Egypt: Arabic title)
 
The Serpent of Death (1989) (as Hala Sidki) .... Nabila
... a.k.a. Out of Time (USA: video box title) 
... a.k.a. ebak maa el zaman (Egypt: Arabic title) 
Nos arnab (1985)
... a.k.a. Half a Million

See also 
Lists of Egyptians

External links

1961 births
Living people
20th-century Egyptian actresses
21st-century Egyptian actresses
Egyptian film actresses
Actresses from Cairo
Egyptian Copts